Proteuxoa verecunda is a moth of the family Noctuidae. It is found in the Australian Capital Territory, New South Wales and Western Australia.

External links
Australian Faunal Directory

Proteuxoa
Moths of Australia
Moths described in 1858